Khagba is a surname. Notable people with the surname include:

Anri Khagba (born 1992), Russian footballer
Roman Khagba (born 1964), Georgian-Russian footballer